Charles Yeung Siu-cho,  (born 19 December 1934) is the first New Territories rural leader to become solicitor and to be appointed to the Legislative Council of Hong Kong.

Yeung was born in the New Territories, Hong Kong on 19 December 1934 to the rural family in Yeung Uk Tsuen, Shap Pat Heung. Graduated from the King's College, Hong Kong and subsequently the University of Hong Kong with a law degree, he went aboard to the study at the University of London and received professional qualifications. In 1961, he returned to Hong Kong and practiced law as a solicitor. He ran for the Urban Council in the 1965 municipal election as a candidate for the Reform Club of Hong Kong but was not elected.

He was also actively involved in the rural politics and had been village representative and member of the Heung Yee Kuk, the powerful organ for the indigenous inhabitants' interests. He was first made New Territories Justice of the Peace in 1974. In 1979, he was appointed to the Legislative Council of Hong Kong by Governor Sir Murray MacLehose, becoming the first legislator with rural background. In 1980, he was awarded Officer of the Order of the British Empire for his services in Hong Kong.

References

1934 births
Living people
Heung Yee Kuk
Alumni of the University of Hong Kong
Alumni of the University of London
Solicitors of Hong Kong
Reform Club of Hong Kong politicians
Members of the Legislative Council of Hong Kong
Officers of the Order of the British Empire
District councillors of Yuen Long District